The Château de la Bastie d'Urfé (also known as Bastie d'Urfé or Bâtie d’Urfé) is a French château in the town of Saint-Étienne-le-Molard, historically within the province of Forez. In the 16th century it was rebuilt in the Renaissance style by Claude d'Urfé and bought in 1836 by Caroline de Lagrange (1806-1870), daughter of count Joseph Lagrange (1763-1836).
The intarsia panelling of the 16th-century chapel is at the Metropolitan Museum of Art.

External links

https://web.archive.org/web/20150315024257/http://www.ladiana.com/Monuments/labatie.html
http://labastie.chez-alice.fr/

Castles in Auvergne-Rhône-Alpes
Forez
Monuments historiques of Loire (department)
Maisons des Illustres